"Do You Wanna Be?" is a song by Australian band I'm Talking. It was released in May 1986 as the lead single from the band's debut studio album, Bear Witness. The song peaked at number 8 on the Australian Kent Music Report, becoming the band's highest charting single and second top ten single. An instrumental version of the song was featured in a club scene in the 1988 film For Queen and Country.

At the 1986 Countdown Australian Music Awards, Kate Ceberano was nominated for Best Female Performance in a Video.

The song's composer and band's guitarist, Robert Goodge, stated "Shannon’s "Let the Music Play", "Give Me Tonight" and Fonda Rae’s "Touch Me" being the main influences, but we added in a harmonic structure that was reminiscent of something Chic might do."

Track listing
 7" Single (K 9925)
 Side A "Do You Wanna Be?" - 4:10
 Side B "Do You Wanna Be?" (instrumental) - 4:10

 12" Single (X 13252)
 Side A "Do You Wanna Be?" (Extended) - 5:15
 Side B1 "Do You Wanna Be?" - 4:10
 Side B2 "Do You Wanna Be?" (instrumental) - 4:10

Charts

Weekly charts

Year-end charts

References 

I'm Talking songs
1986 songs
1986 singles
Regular Records singles